In mathematics, the Laplace operator or Laplacian is a differential operator given by the divergence of the gradient of a scalar function on Euclidean space. In a Cartesian coordinate system, the Laplacian is given by the sum of second partial derivatives of the function with respect to each independent variable. In other coordinate systems, such as cylindrical and spherical coordinates, the Laplacian also has a useful form.

The Laplace operator is named after the French mathematician Pierre-Simon de Laplace (1749–1827), who first applied the operator to the study of celestial mechanics: the Laplacian of the gravitational potential due to a given mass density distribution is a constant multiple of that density distribution. Solutions of Laplace's equation  are called harmonic functions and represent the possible gravitational potentials in regions of vacuum.

The Laplacian occurs in many differential equations describing physical phenomena. Poisson's equation describes  electric and gravitational potentials; the diffusion equation describes heat and fluid flow, the wave equation describes wave propagation, and the Schrödinger equation describes the wave function in quantum mechanics. In image processing and computer vision, the Laplacian operator has been used for various tasks, such as blob and edge detection. The Laplacian is the simplest elliptic operator and is at the core of Hodge theory as well as the results of de Rham cohomology.

Definition
The Laplace operator is a second-order differential operator in the n-dimensional Euclidean space, defined as the divergence of the gradient.

where the latter notations derive from formally writing:

It is a linear operator , or more generally, an operator  for any open set .

Motivation

Diffusion 
In the physical theory of diffusion, the Laplace operator arises naturally in the mathematical description of equilibrium. Specifically, if  is the density at equilibrium of some quantity such as a chemical concentration, then the net flux of  through the  boundary  of any smooth region  is zero, provided there is no source or sink within :

By the divergence theorem,

Since this holds for all smooth regions , one can show that it implies:

The left-hand side of this equation is the Laplace operator, and the entire equation  is known as Laplace's equation. Solutions of the Laplace equation, i.e. functions whose Laplacian is identically zero, thus represent possible equilibrium densities under diffusion.

The Laplace operator itself has a physical interpretation for non-equilibrium diffusion as the extent to which a point represents a source or sink of chemical concentration, in a sense made precise by the diffusion equation. This interpretation of the Laplacian is also explained by the following fact about averages.

Averages 
Then we have:

and

Density associated with a potential 
If  denotes the electrostatic potential associated to a charge distribution , then the charge distribution itself is given by the negative of the Laplacian of :

where  is the electric constant.

This is a consequence of Gauss's law.

where the first equality is due to the divergence theorem. Since the electrostatic field is the (negative) gradient of the potential, this gives:

Since this holds for all regions , we must have

The same approach implies that the negative of the Laplacian of the gravitational potential is the mass distribution. Often the charge (or mass) distribution are given, and the associated potential is unknown. Finding the potential function subject to suitable boundary conditions is equivalent to solving Poisson's equation.

Energy minimization 

Then:

where the last equality follows using Green's first identity.

Coordinate expressions

Two dimensions 
The Laplace operator in two dimensions is given by:

In Cartesian coordinates,

In polar coordinates,

where  represents the radial distance and  the angle.

Three dimensions

In three dimensions, it is common to work with the Laplacian in a variety of different coordinate systems.

In Cartesian coordinates,

In cylindrical coordinates,

where  represents the radial distance,  the azimuth angle and  the height.

In spherical coordinates:

or 

where  represents the azimuthal angle and  the zenith angle or co-latitude.

In general curvilinear coordinates:

where summation over the repeated indices is implied,

dimensions 
In arbitrary curvilinear coordinates in  dimensions, we can write the Laplacian in terms of the inverse metric tensor, :

from the Voss-Weyl formula for the divergence.

In spherical coordinates in  dimensions, with the parametrization  with  representing a positive real radius and  an element of the unit sphere ,

where  is the Laplace–Beltrami operator on the -sphere, known as the spherical Laplacian. The two radial derivative terms can be equivalently rewritten as:

As a consequence, the spherical Laplacian of a function defined on  can be computed as the ordinary Laplacian of the function extended to  so that it is constant along rays, i.e., homogeneous of degree zero.

Euclidean invariance
The Laplacian is invariant under all Euclidean transformations: rotations and translations.  In two dimensions, for example, this means that:

for all θ, a, and b.  In arbitrary dimensions,

whenever ρ is a rotation, and likewise:

whenever τ is a translation. (More generally, this remains true when ρ is an orthogonal transformation such as a reflection.)

In fact, the algebra of all scalar linear differential operators, with constant coefficients, that commute with all Euclidean transformations, is the polynomial algebra generated by the Laplace operator.

Spectral theory

The spectrum of the Laplace operator consists of all eigenvalues  for which there is a corresponding eigenfunction  with:

This is known as the Helmholtz equation.

This result essentially follows from the spectral theorem on compact self-adjoint operators, applied to the inverse of the Laplacian (which is compact, by the Poincaré inequality and the Rellich–Kondrachov theorem). It can also be shown that the eigenfunctions are infinitely differentiable functions. More generally, these results hold for the Laplace–Beltrami operator on any compact Riemannian manifold with boundary, or indeed for the Dirichlet eigenvalue problem of any elliptic operator with smooth coefficients on a bounded domain. When  is the -sphere, the eigenfunctions of the Laplacian are the spherical harmonics.

Vector Laplacian
The vector Laplacian is similar to the scalar Laplacian; whereas the scalar Laplacian applies to a scalar field and returns a scalar quantity, the vector Laplacian applies to a vector field, returning a vector quantity. When computed in orthonormal Cartesian coordinates, the returned vector field is equal to the vector field of the scalar Laplacian applied to each vector component.

The vector Laplacian of a vector field  is defined as

In Cartesian coordinates, this reduces to the much simpler form as

This can be seen to be a special case of Lagrange's formula; see Vector triple product.

For expressions of the vector Laplacian in other coordinate systems see Del in cylindrical and spherical coordinates.

Generalization
The Laplacian of any tensor field  ("tensor" includes scalar and vector) is defined as the divergence of the gradient of the tensor:

For the special case where  is a scalar (a tensor of degree zero), the Laplacian takes on the familiar form.

If  is a vector (a tensor of first degree), the gradient is a covariant derivative which results in a tensor of second degree, and the divergence of this is again a vector. The formula for the vector Laplacian above may be used to avoid tensor math and may be shown to be equivalent to the divergence of the Jacobian matrix shown below for the gradient of a vector:

And, in the same manner, a dot product, which evaluates to a vector, of a vector by the gradient of another vector (a tensor of 2nd degree) can be seen as a product of matrices:

This identity is a coordinate dependent result, and is not general.

Use in physics
An example of the usage of the vector Laplacian is the Navier-Stokes equations for a Newtonian incompressible flow:

where the term with the vector Laplacian of the velocity field  represents the viscous stresses in the fluid.

Another example is the wave equation for the electric field that can be derived from Maxwell's equations in the absence of charges and currents:

This equation can also be written as:

where  is the D'Alembertian, used in the Klein–Gordon equation.

Generalizations 
A version of the Laplacian can be defined wherever the Dirichlet energy functional makes sense, which is the theory of Dirichlet forms.  For spaces with additional structure, one can give more explicit descriptions of the Laplacian, as follows.

Laplace–Beltrami operator 

The Laplacian also can be generalized to an elliptic operator called the Laplace–Beltrami operator defined on a Riemannian manifold. The Laplace–Beltrami operator, when applied to a function, is the trace of the function's Hessian:

where the trace is taken with respect to the inverse of the metric tensor. The Laplace–Beltrami operator also can be generalized to an operator (also called the Laplace–Beltrami operator) which operates on tensor fields, by a similar formula.

Another generalization of the Laplace operator that is available on pseudo-Riemannian manifolds uses the exterior derivative, in terms of which the "geometer's Laplacian" is expressed as

Here  is the codifferential, which can also be expressed in terms of the Hodge star and the exterior derivative. This operator differs in sign from the "analyst's Laplacian" defined above. More generally, the "Hodge" Laplacian is defined on differential forms  by

This is known as the Laplace–de Rham operator, which is related to the Laplace–Beltrami operator by the Weitzenböck identity.

D'Alembertian
The Laplacian can be generalized in certain ways to non-Euclidean spaces, where it may be elliptic, hyperbolic, or ultrahyperbolic.

In Minkowski space the Laplace–Beltrami operator becomes the D'Alembert operator  or D'Alembertian:

It is the generalization of the Laplace operator in the sense that it is the differential operator which is invariant under the isometry group of the underlying space and it reduces to the Laplace operator if restricted to time-independent functions. The overall sign of the metric here is chosen such that the spatial parts of the operator admit a negative sign, which is the usual convention in high-energy particle physics. The D'Alembert operator is also known as the wave operator because it is the differential operator appearing in the wave equations, and it is also part of the Klein–Gordon equation, which reduces to the wave equation in the massless case.

Indeed, theoretical physicists usually work in units such that  in order to simplify the equation.

The d'Alembert operator generalizes to a hyperbolic operator on pseudo-Riemannian manifolds.

See also
Laplace–Beltrami operator, generalization to submanifolds in Euclidean space and Riemannian and pseudo-Riemannian manifold.
The vector Laplacian operator, a generalization of the Laplacian to vector fields.
The Laplacian in differential geometry.
The discrete Laplace operator is a finite-difference analog of the continuous Laplacian, defined on graphs and grids.
The Laplacian is a common operator in image processing and computer vision (see the Laplacian of Gaussian, blob detector, and scale space).
The list of formulas in Riemannian geometry contains expressions for the Laplacian in terms of Christoffel symbols.
Weyl's lemma (Laplace equation).
Earnshaw's theorem which shows that stable static gravitational, electrostatic or magnetic suspension is impossible.
Del in cylindrical and spherical coordinates.
Other situations in which a Laplacian is defined are: analysis on fractals, time scale calculus and discrete exterior calculus.

Notes

References

The Feynman Lectures on Physics Vol. II Ch. 12: Electrostatic Analogs
.
.

Further reading
The Laplacian - Richard Fitzpatrick 2006

External links

Laplacian in polar coordinates derivation
equations on the fractal cubes and Casimir effect

Differential operators
Elliptic partial differential equations
Fourier analysis
Operator
Harmonic functions
Linear operators in calculus
Multivariable calculus